Brien is a surname and male given name. Notable people with this name include:

Surname
 Alan Brien (1925–2008), English journalist
 Alizée Brien (born 1993), Canadian racing cyclist
 Chris Brien, drummer, percussionist and drum clinician
 Don Brien (born 1959), Canadian sprint canoer
 Doug Brien (born 1970), American football placekicker
 Edward Brien (1811–1902), Archdeacon of Emly
 Francis Brien, pseudonym of Australian writer Hilary Lofting
 James Brien (1848–1907), politician and physician
 Jennifer Brien, American talk radio host
 Jerry Brien, Australian rugby league football player
 John Wesley Brien (1864–1949), Canadian politician and physician
 Jon D. Brien, American politician
 Kathleen Brien, also known as Katy B (born 1989), English singer and songwriter
 Lévis Brien (born 1955), Canadian politician
 Pierre Brien (born 1970), Canadian politician
 Raley Brien, pseudonym of American writer Johnston McCulley
 Robert Brien (born 1944), Australian tennis player
 Rory Brien (born 1991), Australian rugby league football player
 Timothy Brien, defendant in Varnum v. Brien
 Tony Brien (born 1969), Irish football player
 William Roy Brien (1930–1987), English football player
 William W. Brien, American orthopedic surgeon

Given name
 Brien Best (born 1996), Barbadian weightlifter
 Brien Cobcroft (1934–2010), Australian equestrian
 Brien Cokayne, 1st Baron Cullen of Ashbourne (1864–1932), British businessman and banker
 Brien Cullen, American football coach
 Brien McIlroy (1939–1995), Scottish football player
 Brien McMahon (1903–1952), American lawyer and politician
 Brien S. Wygle (1924–2020), American pilot
 Brien Taylor (born 1971), pitcher in minor league baseball

See also
 O'Brien (disambiguation)
 Brian
 Bryan (disambiguation)
 Brayan